McDonald is a city in Rawlins County, Kansas, United States.  As of the 2020 census, the population of the city was 113.

History
A post office was opened in Celia (an extinct town) in 1880, but it was moved to McDonald in 1888. McDonald was named for Rice McDonald, a landowner.

Geography
McDonald is located at  (39.785196, -101.370435).

Climate
According to the Köppen Climate Classification system, McDonald has a semi-arid climate, abbreviated "BSk" on climate maps.

According to weather data tallied between July 1, 1985 and June 30, 2015 for every location in the National Oceanic and Atmospheric Administration's official climate database, McDonald, Kansas, is the snowiest place in the state of Kansas with an average of 37.6 inches of snow per year.

Demographics

2010 census
As of the census of 2010, there were 160 people, 77 households, and 48 families residing in the city. The racial makeup of the city was 97.5% White, 0.6% Native American, 0.6% from other races, and 1.3% from two or more races. Hispanic or Latino of any race were 11.3% of the population.

There were 77 households, of which 16.9% had children under the age of 18 living with them, 50.6% were married couples living together, 7.8% had a female householder with no husband present, 3.9% had a male householder with no wife present, and 37.7% were non-families. 32.5% of all households were made up of individuals, and 16.9% had someone living alone who was 65 years of age or older. The average household size was 2.08 and the average family size was 2.63.

The median age in the city was 53.5 years. 18.1% of residents were under the age of 18; 6.3% were between the ages of 18 and 24; 14.5% were from 25 to 44; 35.7% were from 45 to 64; and 25.6% were 65 years of age or older. The gender makeup of the city was 50.0% male and 50.0% female.

2000 census
As of the census of 2000, there were 159 people, 80 households, and 46 families residing in the city. The racial makeup of the city was 99.37% White and 0.63% Native American.

There were 80 households, out of which 18.8% had children under the age of 18 living with them, 53.8% were married couples living together, 2.5% had a female householder with no husband present, and 42.5% were non-families. 40.0% of all households were made up of individuals, and 27.5% had someone living alone who was 65 years of age or older. The average household size was 1.99 and the average family size was 2.63.

In the city, the population was spread out, with 19.5% under the age of 18, 3.8% from 18 to 24, 18.9% from 25 to 44, 28.3% from 45 to 64, and 29.6% who were 65 years of age or older. The median age was 49 years. For every 100 females, there were 89.3 males. For every 100 females age 18 and over, there were 85.5 males.

The median income for a household in the city was $30,139, and the median income for a family was $32,083. Males had a median income of $23,125 versus $33,125 for females. The per capita income for the city was $15,790. About 13.3% of families and 11.8% of the population were below the poverty line, including 8.8% of those under the age of eighteen and 21.1% of those 65 or over.

Education
McDonald is served by Cheylin USD 103. School unification consolidated Bird City and McDonald schools in 1975 creating USD 103. The Cheylin High School mascot is Cheylin Cougars.

McDonald High School was closed through school unification. The McDonald High School mascot was Tigers.

Notable people
 Link Lyman (1898–1972) - football player and coach.

References

Further reading

External links
 McDonald - Directory of Public Officials
 Photos of McDonald
 McDonald city map, KDOT

Cities in Kansas
Cities in Rawlins County, Kansas
1888 establishments in Kansas
Populated places established in 1888